Lieutenant Edward Patrick Kenny (born January 1888, date of death unknown) was an Australian World War I flying ace credited with seven aerial victories. He served in Egypt with 1 Squadron in 1918 and returned to Australia on 5 March 1919.

References

1888 births
20th-century deaths
Year of death missing
Australian World War I flying aces